West Hickory is an unincorporated community in Forest County, Pennsylvania, United States. West Hickory has a post office with ZIP code 16370.

Notable person
 Emeline Harriet Howe (1844–1934), poet

References

Unincorporated communities in Forest County, Pennsylvania
Unincorporated communities in Pennsylvania